Let the Four Winds Blow is the second album by Tenpole Tudor and the follow-up to Eddie, Old Bob, Dick and Gary. Despite featuring the minor hit "Throwing My Baby Out With the Bath Water" (#49 in November 1981) the album and the follow-up single (the title track "Let the Four Winds Blow") both failed to chart. It would be 27 years before the next album, Made it this Far would be released.

Track listing

1982 LP (SEEZ 42)
"Let the Four Winds Blow" (Tudorpole) - 3:28
"Throwing My Baby Out With the Bathwater" (Tudorpole, Kingston, Long) - 3:31
"Trumpeters" (Tudorpole) - 4:11
"It's Easy to See" (Tudorpole, Kingston, Long) - 3:48
"What You Doing in Bombay" (Tudorpole, Kingston, Long, Crippen) - 4:03
"Local Animal" (Tudorpole, Kingston, Long, Crippen, Universe) - 4:04
"Her Fruit is Forbidden" (Tudorpole, Kingston) - 2:57
"Tonight is the Night" (Tudorpole, Long) - 3:44
"The Unpaid Debt" (Tudorpole, Crippen) - 3:18
"The King of Siam" (Tudorpole, Crippen, Long) - 3:56

1993 CD reissue (STIFFCD 12) 
"Let the Four Winds Blow" - 3:28
"Throwing My Baby Out With the Bathwater" - 3:31
"Trumpeters" - 4:11
"It's Easy to See" - 3:48
"What You Doing in Bombay" - 4:03
"Local Animal" - 4:04
"Her Fruit is Forbidden" - 2:57
"Tonight is the Night" - 3:44
"The Unpaid Debt" - 3:18
"The King of Siam" - 3:56
"Sea of Thunder" - 2:57
"Conga Tribe" - 4:01
"Tenpole 45" - 4:15
"Fashion" - 2:51
"Rock and Roll Music" - 2:23

Although uncredited, both "Fashion" and "Rock and Roll Music" are live versions recorded at the Marquee.

2007 CD reissue (CDSEEZ 31) 
"Let the Four Winds Blow" - 3:28
"Throwing My Baby Out With the Bathwater" - 3:31
"Trumpeters" - 4:11
"It's Easy to See" - 3:48
"What You Doing in Bombay" - 4:03
"Local Animal" - 4:04
"Her Fruit is Forbidden" - 2:57
"Tonight is the Night" - 3:44
"The Unpaid Debt" - 3:18
"The King of Siam" - 3:56
"Conga Tribe" - 4:01
"Sea of Thunder" - 2:57
"Tied Up With Lou Cool" (The Tudors) - 3:24
"Cry Baby Cry" (The Tudors) - 3:50
"The Hayrick Song" (Eddie Tenpole Tudor) - 3:19
"Take You to the Dance" (Eddie Tenpole Tudor) - 3:21
"The Hayrick Song" (Extended Square Dance Version) (Eddie Tenpole Tudor) - 6:06

Personnel
Tenpole Tudor
Dick Crippen – bass, vocals, producer
Bob Kingston – guitar, piano, vocals
Gary Long – percussion, drums, vocals
 Eddie Tudorpole – guitar, piano, saxophone, vocals
Munch Universe – guitar, percussion, vocals
Technical
Alan Winstanley – producer
David M. Allen - engineer
Kim Aldis - photography

References

1982 albums
Tenpole Tudor albums
Stiff Records albums
Albums produced by Alan Winstanley